There are at least eight mazurkas by Chopin without opus number, usually designated as Op. posth., though at least four of these were published in his lifetime.
 2 mazurkas in B major and G major were composed and published in 1826 in revised versions; the originals were published in 1875. B. 16
 D major, B. 31 (1829); revised version, B. 71 (1832)
 B major (Wolowska), B. 73 (1832) – dedicated to Alexandrine Wolowska
 C major, B. 82 (1833)
 A major, B. 85 (1834)
 A minor (Notre Temps), B.134 (1840) – published (1841) in the collection "Six morceaux de salon", issued by the magazine Notre Temps along with works by Thalberg, Czerny and others. 
 A minor (À Émile Gaillard), B.140 (1840) – published (1841) in "Album de pianistes polonais". Dedicated to Émile Gaillard.

References 

Mazurkas by Frédéric Chopin